Tax deferral refers to instances where a taxpayer can delay paying taxes to some future period. In theory, the net taxes paid should be the same. Taxes can sometimes be deferred indefinitely, or may be taxed at a lower rate in the future, particularly for deferral of income taxes.

Corporate tax deferral
Corporations (or other enterprises) may often be allowed to defer taxes, for example, by using accelerated depreciation. Profit taxes (or other taxes) are reduced in the current period by either lowering declared revenue now, or by increasing expenses. In principle, taxes in future periods should be higher.

Income tax deferral
In many jurisdictions, income taxes may be deferred to future periods by a number of means. For example, income may be recognized in future years by using income tax deductions, or certain expenses may be provided as deductions in current rather than future periods. A 2010 study documents the large extent to which U.S. taxpayers accelerate their deductible state tax income taxes by prepaying them in December, instead of their normally due January of the following year.
In jurisdictions where tax rates are progressive – meaning that income taxes as a percentage of income are higher for higher incomes or tax brackets, resulting in a higher marginal tax rate – this often results in lower taxes paid, regardless of the time value of money.

Tax-deferred retirement accounts exist in many jurisdictions, and allow individuals to declare income later in life; if the individuals also have lower income in retirement, taxes paid may be considerably lower. In Canada, contributions to registered retirement savings plans or RRSPs are deducted from income, and earnings (interest, dividends and capital gains) in these accounts are not taxed; only withdrawals from the retirement account are taxed as income.

Other types of retirement accounts will defer taxes only on income earned in the account. In the United States, a number of different forms of retirement savings accounts exist with different characteristics and limits, including 401ks, IRAs, and more.

As long as the individual makes withdrawals when he or she is in a lower tax bracket (that is, has a lower marginal tax rate), total taxes payable will be lower.

On the other hand, some people (primarily business owners) may choose to do the opposite of deferring their tax liabilities by "prepaying" personal income tax that would otherwise be payable in future years. For example, if it is known that tax rates will be increasing in a future tax year, a business owner can reduce his total tax liability by paying himself/herself a higher salary and/or bonuses in the current tax year, even if he or she has to loan the business money to do so. In most jurisdictions, the principal of such loans can be collected by the owner tax free at any time, thus allowing the owner to be paid a lower salary than would otherwise be the case once the tax rate increases. Alternatively, the owner of a new or struggling business can be paid a higher salary than his or her company can nominally afford to pay in hopes that when the business is more profitable, the amount of taxes owing in higher tax brackets will be less or none at all. At the very least, it is usually advisable for business owners to at least pay themselves enough salary to use up all of their basic personal exemptions for a given tax year, since these exemptions typically cannot be deferred to a future tax year. However, if applied aggressively, this can be a risky strategy depending on the jurisdiction – if the business fails, the owners' ability to benefit from the nominal write-offs and losses accrued in earlier years might be limited or non-existent.

International tax deferral

Taxes on profits derived from foreign investments may also be deferred via the retention and reinvestment of corporate earnings in foreign lower-tax countries. The advantages of this kind of tax deferral can be attributed to two partially interdependent effects, the tax rate effect and the interest effect:

The tax rate effect is based on the fact that as long as the profit of a (supposed) subsidiary is not distributed to the domestic (corporate or individual) shareholder, the profit is not taxed in the shareholder's country. If the foreign tax rate is lower than the domestic one, profits can thus be retained in order to shelter them from domestic taxation. In case of exemption of foreign profits (as it is e.g. the case for corporate shareholders in Germany), this tax rate advantage is final.

The interest effect derives from the fact that if the foreign tax rate is low, the tax rate effect on the net yield is growing with time as the amount of additional interest increases exponentially (interest advantage). Therefore, given equal gross yields, e.g. regarding mobile financial assets, it is more profitable to invest in low-tax countries: The net yield is higher in a low-tax country than in a high-tax country and hence the capital grows at a faster rate. That interest effect cannot be wholly eliminated, even if there is additional taxation upon distribution (e.g. like in a shareholder relief system or with the credit method).

References

See also
 Companies of the United States with untaxed profits
 Individual Retirement Account
 Deferred compensation
 401k

Tax avoidance